Salsaringer is a Lower Franconian dialect-band.

Band and genre 

Salsaringer is a Kahlgrund-based band, which presents self written music and song texts from the Kahlgrund with singer Timo Wiesmann (Schweinheim), bass player Martin Brückner (Geiselbach), guitar player Josef Bayer (Schöllkrippen) and drummer Helmut Dedio (Omersbach). They play Rock, Latin, Jazz, Folk using the local dialect.

Songs 

The band has a wide variety of songs and topics, mostly taken from regular village life, such as: Oscar, the ganter, waking up by aeroplanes, tractors and chain saws; gamblers in Les Vagos; gardeners, who change completely in spring; and what happens if you ask Renate O. in Mömbris-Dörnsteinbach for directions to Omersbach.

References

External links 
 

German musical groups